Part of a railway signaling system, a slide fence is a fence whose purpose is to prevent trains from being derailed by rockslides in mountainous areas where rockslides may occur without warning. The fence is designed to be displaced by a rock slide, causing the signaling system to display a stop aspect on nearby signals. As an alternative, a structural fence is designed to physically stop falling rocks from reaching the tracks.

Operation

Mechanical
When a rock slide occurs, the rock breaks one or more of the wires. When a wire breaks, heavy weights attached to either end will fall. This mechanically triggers the protecting signals to the 'danger' position.

Electrical
There are two types of electrical slide fences in operation.

This creates an electrical circuit that is monitored by signaling equipment. In normal operation, the electric current in the fence wires causes a relay to energize, indicating that the fence is intact. When a rock slide occurs, the rock breaks one or more of the wires, interrupting the current. This causes the relay to become de-energized, indicating that a rock slide has occurred. A contact of the relay is typically used to prevent the approaching signal from displaying a proceed aspect if the fence has been broken. Restoring normal operation requires splicing the broken fence wires back together.

Another type of slide fence is similar except that the wires do not have to break and is easier to maintain and reset. The slide fence consists of a series of fence sections, as shown in the SLIDE FENCE DETAIL drawing (pictured right), which shows a typical installation. Each fence section is held in place by strong springs. At each end of a fence section is an electro-mechanical plug. The plugs maintain a complete electrical circuit that is monitored by signaling equipment. In normal operation, the current through the plugs causes a relay to energize, indicating that the fence is in place. When a rock slide occurs, the fence moves laterally, causing the plug to be removed, breaking the circuit. This causes the relay to become de-energized, indicating that a rock slide has occurred. A contact of the relay is typically used to prevent the approaching signal from displaying a proceed aspect if the fence has been broken. Restoring normal operation requires re-inserting the plugs that were dislodged by the slide.

Structural fence
The structural fence is a physical barrier designed to stop falling rocks from reaching the tracks. Several construction methods are used, including: steel I-beams, wooden barriers, galvanized fencing, and netting directly against the rock.

Where used

A slide fence is typically found in mountainous areas in a rock cut area, where rocks may fall on the track and present a danger to passing trains. The slide fence is usually located on the uphill side of the track in the slide area.

Select examples of railroad slide fences:
1) On the Union Pacific Railroad's Moffat Subdivision, trains pass through three major canyons — Byers Canyon, Gore Canyon, and Glenwood Canyon, all three of which feature rock fences.
2) Stretches of the BNSF Railway's Hi-Line, such as on the western approach to Marias Pass, and a small canyon called Bad Rock Canyon east of Columbia Falls, Montana, are equipped with rock fences.

Consequences of slide fence activation
When a train approaches a slide fence area, and the signal displays a stop aspect, the train is not permitted to proceed normally, because a rock slide has occurred. However, the rock slide may not prevent the safe passage of the train. For example, a large rock may have fallen off the cliff, broken through the slide fence, and continued to fall away from the track. After stopping, the train may obtain radio permission from the dispatch center to proceed slowly, watching for a dangerous rock slide. If the train is able to successfully pass through the slide area (that is, there is no danger), it may then be allowed to proceed normally.

In North America slide fences are typically connected in such a way as to shunt the track circuit when activated. This causes signals on either side of the slide fence to display a restricting indication, requiring trains to travel at a speed enabling them to stop within one half the range of vision. On lines formerly operated by the Pennsylvania Railroad signals connected to a slide detector have an 'SP' placard, reminding engineers to watch for slides when governed by a restrictive speed signal.

Once the slide fence has been activated (even if in error), all trains are affected until the slide fence is repaired by maintenance personnel. This may result in several hours of delay in train service.

Alternatives
Several alternative technologies have been tried to solve the rock slide problem, including:
Acoustic sensing
 Avalanche control
Electromagnetic sensing
Seismic sensing
Visual sensing, using cameras

See also

Pass of Brander stone signals

References

Train protection systems